Giovanni Alejandro Reyna (born November 13, 2002) is an American professional soccer player who plays as an attacking midfielder or winger for  club Borussia Dortmund and the United States national team. He is considered one of the best young players in the world.

Reyna began his youth career with his hometown club, New York City FC, and had his breakthrough with Borussia Dortmund where he was included in The Guardians "Next Generation 2019." During the 2019-20 DFB-Pokal he became the youngest scorer in the tournament's history at the age of 17. He was a candidate for the 2022 Golden Boy award.

Born to U.S. national team players Claudio Reyna and Danielle Egan, he has represented the United States at several youth levels, scoring 16 goals in 31 youth caps. Reyna made his debut for the senior team in November 2020 and won the 2019-20 CONCACAF Nations League. Individually he won a U.S. Soccer Young Male Player of the Year award in 2020.

Early life
Reyna was born in Sunderland, England to American parents, Claudio Reyna and Danielle Egan, when his father was playing for Sunderland A.F.C. Both of his parents are former soccer players who played for the United States men's and women's national teams, respectively. His family moved back to the United States, settling in Bedford, New York, in 2007 when Giovanni was five. Giovanni joined the academy team of his hometown club, New York City FC, in 2015 and kept playing with the City FC Academy teams until 2019 when he moved to Germany to join Borussia Dortmund's academy.

Club career

Borussia Dortmund

2019–21: Breakthrough and DFB-Pokal
On January 18, 2020, Reyna made his Bundesliga debut for Borussia Dortmund, coming on as a substitute in the 72nd minute, in a 5–3 win against FC Augsburg. Hence, he became the youngest American, aged 17 years and 66 days, ever to appear in the Bundesliga, breaking a record previously set by Christian Pulisic.

On February 4, Reyna scored his first professional goal in a 3–2 defeat to Werder Bremen in the DFB-Pokal Round of 16. In doing so, he became the youngest goalscorer in German Cup history. On February 18, 2020, Reyna became the third-youngest player ever to appear in a knockout game of the UEFA Champions League when he came on as a substitute in the 67th minute against Paris Saint-Germain. Nine minutes later, Reyna set up Erling Haaland's game-winning goal for Borussia Dortmund in the second leg of the Round of 16, becoming the youngest American to play and record an assist in a Champions League fixture.

On May 16, Reyna was set to start his first Bundesliga match for Borussia Dortmund in their derby against Schalke, but suffered a calf injury during warm-ups. Reyna returned on May 23 and played in the final 11 minutes of a 2–0 victory at VfL Wolfsburg. On September 14, 2020, Reyna started in a DFB-Pokal match and scored with a free kick in a 5–0 win against MSV Duisburg. On September 19, 2020, Reyna scored his first Bundesliga goal in a 3–0 win against Borussia Mönchengladbach, aged 17 years and 311 days, to become the second youngest American scorer in Bundesliga behind Christian Pulisic, aged 17 years and 211 days.

On October 3, 2020, in his third league appearance of the 2020–21 season, Reyna assisted 3 goals—a brace to Erling Haaland and an Emre Can header from a corner kick, to beat SC Freiburg 4–0. As a result, Reyna became the first American to record a hat trick of assists in one of the 5 major European leagues since Steve Cherundolo did it for Hannover in March 2008, and the youngest player to ever do so in the Bundesliga.

On December 5, Reyna scored his second Bundesliga goal against Eintracht Frankfurt, with a near post finish just inside the 18-yard box. This goal made him the second youngest American to score twice in the league after current Chelsea winger Christian Pulisic did so for the same club as Reyna, Borussia Dortmund. On December 22, he was voted the U.S. Soccer's Young Male Player of the Year for 2020.

Reyna was a second-half substitute for Dortmund in their 4–1 victory over RB Leipzig in the 2021 DFB-Pokal Final on May 13, 2021. His involvement in the match marks him as the youngest American to appear in a domestic cup final in Europe, a record previously held by his international teammate Christian Pulisic.

2021–22 season: Injuries
On July 28, 2021, Dortmund announced that Reyna would wear the number 7 shirt for the upcoming season, previously worn by Jadon Sancho. On August 27, he became the youngest player to make 50 Bundesliga appearances during the league match against Hoffenheim. 

Reyna suffered a series of injuries that caused him to miss the majority of the 2021–22 season.

2022–23 season 
Returning from injuries, on September 6, 2022, Reyna became the first American player to provide two assists in a Champions League match in a 3–0 win against Copenhagen.

International career
After representing the United States at several youth levels, Reyna received his first call up to the senior United States squad for matches against Wales and Panama in November 2020. On November 12, 2020, a day before his eighteenth birthday, Reyna made his senior national team debut against Wales. In the following game, a 6–2 friendly victory over Panama, Reyna started and scored his first senior goal directly from a free kick.

On March 24, 2022, during a third-round 2022 World Cup qualification match against Mexico at Estadio Azteca, Reyna dribbled past six Mexican defenders in a single run before being dispossessed; after the match it was compared to Diego Maradona's "Goal of the Century" run during the quarter-finals of the 1986 World Cup, which was also at the Azteca.

In the 2022 FIFA World Cup, Reyna played only 52 minutes in four games. His sidelining throughout the group stage of the tournament led to speculation from analysts of possible issues within the team. USMNT Head Coach Gregg Berhalter publicly addressed issues regarding an anonymous player for a lack of commitment and poor attitude, and confirmed that the team had held a meeting to determine if that player were to remain with the team in Qatar for the remainder of the tournament. On December 12, 2022, Reyna confirmed that he was the aforementioned player about whom Berhalter was speaking, and apologized for his behavior while criticizing the decision to publicize the information. In January 2023, it was revealed that Berhalter had been confronted during the tournament about damaging personal information that was floated to superiors. Danielle Egan, Reyna's mother, confirmed that she was the one who informed the U.S. Soccer Federation about the episode of violent behavior between Berhalter and his wife from 1991.

Personal life
Giovanni is the son of former Rangers, Sunderland, Manchester City, New York Red Bulls, and United States player Claudio Reyna, and Danielle Egan, a former member of the United States women's national soccer team. Reyna is of Argentine-Portuguese descent through father’s parents and of Irish-American descent through his mother. His older brother, Jack, died of brain cancer in 2012, at the age of 13. 

Reyna was born in Sunderland, England, while his father was playing for Sunderland. Reyna started his international career by playing with the United States' youth teams, but after impressing with Borussia Dortmund, he attracted interest from the Portuguese, English, and Argentine national teams. Ultimately, in a March 2020 interview with Sports Illustrated, Reyna declared his intent to play for the United States: "I'm aware of the rumors, but it's quite clear for me. I only want to play for the United States. That's my home country."

He was named after his father's former Rangers teammate Giovanni van Bronckhorst.

Reyna's high level of play has earned him the nickname "The American Dream" by former teammate Erling Haaland.

Career statistics

Club

International

Scores and results list United States' goal tally first, score column indicates score after each Reyna goal.

Honors
Borussia Dortmund
DFB-Pokal: 2020–21

United States
CONCACAF Nations League: 2019–20

Individual
CONCACAF U-17 Championship Best XI: 2019
U.S. Soccer's Young Male Player of the Year: 2020
CONCACAF Nations League Finals Best XI: 2021

References

External links

 Profile at the Borussia Dortmund website
 

2002 births
Living people
Footballers from Sunderland
Soccer players from New York City
American soccer players
United States men's international soccer players
United States men's youth international soccer players
Association football midfielders
Borussia Dortmund players
Bundesliga players
2022 FIFA World Cup players
American expatriate soccer players
American expatriate soccer players in Germany
American people of Argentine descent
American people of Irish descent
American people of Portuguese descent